Secrets of the World is the first studio album by Baltimore, Maryland hardcore punk band Trapped Under Ice. It was released in 2009 on Reaper Records. In Europe, the album was released by German record label Demons Run Amok Entertainment.

Track listing

References

2009 albums
Trapped Under Ice (band) albums
Demons Run Amok Entertainment albums